Davis Mercantile, in Milnesand, New Mexico, was listed on the National Register of Historic Places in 2018.

It is a historic crossroads store, built in 1932–35, and has also been known as the Flying M Store.  The store is a two-story, three-bay frame building with a gable roof, and a full-width shed-roofed porch.  A sign on the main facade states "U.S. Post Office / Davis Mercantile / Milnesand, N. Mex.".  The store was expanded by a one-story addition around 1962.

The listing includes the store, the Davis house, and several outbuildings and structures.

It is located at 4610 New Mexico State Road 206.

References

National Register of Historic Places in Roosevelt County, New Mexico
Buildings and structures completed in 1935